It's the Same World is a 1980 American short documentary film produced by Dick Young. It was nominated for an Academy Award for Best Documentary Short.

References

External links
It's the Same World at the United Nations Audiovisual Library

1980 films
1980 short films
1980 documentary films
American short documentary films
1980s short documentary films
1980s English-language films
1980s American films